The World Series Cricket Rest Of The World XI was a cricket team representing the Rest of the World in World Series Cricket (WSC). Their first game was against the Australia XI in 1978. World Series Cricket ended in 1979 after the Australia XI tour to West Indies. The side was captained by former England captain Tony Greig, who was assigned to recruit his teammates. Greig's former England teammates Derek Underwood, Dennis Amiss, John Snow and star wicketkeeper Alan Knott were signed along with many players from Pakistan, including national icon Imran Khan. Rest Of The World XI also offered competitive international class cricket to players from South Africa, who were then barred from international cricket, such as Barry Richards, Garth Le Roux and Mike Procter.

Players

Records (Supertests)
The following are records by players who exclusively played WSC matches for the World XI

Highest team total
Highest team total (over 350 runs only)

Most runs

Highest individual scores
Note: Only top five scores listed.

Most wickets

Best bowling
 Note: Only top 5 figures shown.

References

See also
World Series Cricket results
World Series Cricket player records
WSC Australia XI
WSC West Indies XI
WSC Cavaliers XI

World Series Cricket teams